Nicotine & Tobacco Research (N&TR) is a monthly peer-reviewed medical journal covering research pertaining to tobacco products and nicotine. It was established in 1999 and is the official journal of the Society for Research on Nicotine and Tobacco. It is published by Oxford University Press and the editor-in-chief is Marcus Munafò (University of Bristol). According to the Journal Citation Reports, the journal has a 2018 impact factor of 3.786, ranking it 3rd out of 19 journals in the SI category "Substance Abuse".

References

External links

Addiction medicine journals
Oxford University Press academic journals
Publications established in 1999
Monthly journals
English-language journals
Tobacco control journals